Muhammad Surya Maulana (born 9 July 2001) is an Indonesian professional footballer who plays as a defender for Liga 1 club Bhayangkara.

Club career

Bhayangkara
He was signed for Bhayangkara to play in Liga 1 in the 2021 season. Surya made his professional debut on 6 December 2021 in a match against Persela Lamongan at the Maguwoharjo Stadium, Sleman.

Career statistics

Club

Notes

References

External links
 Surya Maulana at Soccerway
 Surya Maulana at Liga Indonesia

2001 births
Living people
Indonesian footballers
Bhayangkara F.C. players
Association football defenders
Sportspeople from Surabaya